Yrjö Henrik Kilpinen (4 February 18922 March 1959) was a Finnish composer. He was born in Helsinki, and in 1907 he started his studies in the Helsingin Musiikkiopisto (later named Sibelius Academy). In 1910 Kilpinen moved to Vienna to continue his studies and from 1913 to 1914 he studied in Berlin. He travelled extensively in Scandinavia and central Europe, especially Germany. He became an honorary professor in 1942 and was elected to the Finnish Academy in 1948.

Kilpinen is most famous for composing 790 works in the Lieder style. Among his other works were six piano sonatas, a violin sonata and a cello sonata.

As a lied composer he should be considered as one of the most remarkable names of the 20th century. During the 1930s and 1940s he was internationally the most well-known Finnish composer after Jean Sibelius.

Kilpinen's friendship with the German national-socialistic leaders brought him a bad name after the war, after which he was more or less a "persona non grata" in Finland. Kilpinen remains a controversial figure to this very day despite the continuous popularity of his music — him being a Nazi-sympathiser still casts a dark shadow upon his reputation as well as his extensive history of pedophilia; which included him impregnating underage girls.

In April 1999, the North American Yrjö Kilpinen Society came into existence.
The Sousa Archives and Center for American Music at the University of Illinois at Urbana-Champaign holds the Jeffrey Sandborg Collection of Yrjo Kilpinen Music, 1920–1940, which consists of published scores, manuscripts (originals and facsimiles), newspaper and journal articles, concert programs, photographs, phonograph and reel-to-reel recordings.

Literature
The Biographical Dictionary of Musicians, pg. 234.  © 1940 Blue Ribbon Books, Inc. (Original © 1903.)

External links
Kimmo Korhonen: Inventing Finnish Music – Contemporary Composers from Medieval to Modern, retrieved October 4, 2006

References

1892 births
1959 deaths
Finnish classical composers
Neoclassical composers
Finnish male classical composers
20th-century male musicians
Controversies in Finland
Child sexual abuse in Finland
20th-century Finnish composers